Shadow and Act is a 1964 collection of essays by Ralph Ellison.

Subject 
The writings encompass the two decades that began with Ellison's involvement with African-American political activism and print media in Harlem, Ellison's emergence as a highly acclaimed writer with the publication of Invisible Man, and culminating with his 1964 challenge of Irving Howe's characterization of African-American life, "Black Boys and Native Sons", with his now famous essay, "The World and the Jug". Ellison in his Introduction to the collection described it as exemplary of his "attempt to transform some of the themes, the problems, the enigmas, the contradictions of character and culture native to my predicament, into what André Malraux has described as 'conscious thought'."

Title 
The title of the collection derives from Ellison's 1948 review of the film version of William Faulkner's Intruder in the Dust, entitled "The Shadow and the Act", which expanded upon his critique in "Twentieth Century Fiction and the Black Mask of Humanity" of the vicious and detrimental stereotypes rampant in mainstream American culture. Ellison derived the actual phrase "Shadow and Act" from the fifth Stanza of T.S. Eliot's The Hollow Men, which reads: "Between the idea / And the reality / Between the motion / And the act / Falls the Shadow."

Reception 
Reviewing the book in 1965, R. W. B. Lewis said: "Shadow and Act contains Ralph Ellison’s real autobiography....The experiences of writing Invisible Man and of vaulting on his first try “over the parochial limits of most Negro fiction” (as Richard G. Stern says in an interview), and, as a result, of being written about as a literary and sociological phenomenon, combined with sheer compositional difficulties, seem to have driven Ellison to search out the truths of his own past. Inquiring into his experience, his literary and musical education, Ellison has come up with a number of clues to the fantastic fate of trying to be at the same time a writer, a Negro, an American, and a human being."

In 1999, the Modern Library named this book at number 91 on its list of the 100 best nonfiction books of the 20th century.

References

Books by Ralph Ellison
Essay collections